Soo-min, also spelled Su-min, is a Korean unisex name. Its meaning depends on the hanja used to write each syllable of the name. There are 67 hanja with the reading "soo" and 27 hanja with the reading "min" on the South Korean government's official list of hanja which may be registered for use in given names.

People with this name include:
Choi Soo-min (born 1981), retired South Korean female swimmer
Choi Su-min (born 1990), South Korean women's handball player
Lee Soo-min (golfer) (born 1993), South Korean female golfer
Jo Soo-min (born 1999), South Korean actress
Lee Soo-min (actress, born 2001) (born 2001), South Korean actress

Fictional characters with this name include:
Chae Su-min, in 2004 South Korean television series April Kiss
Lee Su-min, in 2006 South Korean film No Regret
Jung Soo-min, in 2013 South Korean television series Iris II
Yoon Soo-min, in 2013 South Korean television series Cruel City

See also
List of Korean given names

References

Korean unisex given names